Thomas Henley may refer to:

 Thomas Henley (Australian politician) (1860–1935), member of the New South Wales Legislative Assembly
 Thomas Henley (pirate), pirate and privateer active in the Red Sea and the Caribbean
 Thomas J. Henley (1810–1875), U.S. Representative from Indiana